SR111 may refer to:

 List of highways numbered 111
 Swissair Flight 111